Milan Janić (14 June 1957 in Bačka Palanka - 1 January 2003 in Belgrade) was a Serbian sprint canoeist who competed from the late 1970s to the mid-1980s for Yugoslavia. Competing in two Summer Olympics, he won a silver medal in the K-1 1000 m event at Los Angeles in 1984.

Janić also won six medals at the ICF Canoe Sprint World Championships with three golds (K-1 10000 m: 1978, 1979, 1982) and three silvers (K-1 1000 m: 1978, K-1 1000 m: 1981, 1983).

Three of his children are also accomplished canoeists: Nataša Janić, Mićo Janić and Stjepan Janić.

References

Wallechinsky, David and Jaime Loucky (2008). "Canoeing: Women's Kayak Singles 500 Meters". In The Complete Book of the Olympics: 2008 Edition. London: Aurum Press Limited. p. 492.

External links 
 

1957 births
2003 deaths
Canoeists at the 1980 Summer Olympics
Canoeists at the 1984 Summer Olympics
Olympic canoeists of Yugoslavia
Olympic silver medalists for Yugoslavia
Serbian male canoeists
Yugoslav male canoeists
Olympic medalists in canoeing
ICF Canoe Sprint World Championships medalists in kayak
People from Bačka Palanka

Medalists at the 1984 Summer Olympics
Competitors at the 1979 Mediterranean Games
Mediterranean Games silver medalists for Yugoslavia
Mediterranean Games medalists in canoeing